Protein expression may refer to:

Gene expression, the processes that convert the information of DNA genes into a functional copies of mRNA in living cells
Protein production, the method of generating some quantity of a specific protein in biotechnology